Protein FAM3B is a protein that in humans is encoded by the FAM3B gene.

References

Further reading

External links 
 PDBe-KB provides an overview of all the structure information available in the PDB for Mouse Protein FAM3B